Burlington Industries, Inc. v. Ellerth, 524 U.S. 742 (1998), is a landmark employment law case of the United States Supreme Court holding that employers are liable if supervisors create a hostile work environment for employees. Ellerth also introduced a two-part affirmative defense allowing employers to avoid sex discrimination liability if they follow best practices. Ellerth is often considered alongside Faragher.

Facts
Kimberly Ellerth, a female employee at Burlington Industries, sued the company for sexual harassment on the part of her male supervisor. She alleged the vice president of sales made offensive remarks and unwanted overtures. She identified three episodes involving threats to deny tangible job benefits unless sexual favors were granted. She alleged a violation of title VII of the Civil Rights Act of 1964. The lower court dismissed her claim, noting that she had suffered no actual negative job consequences. The Seventh Circuit Court of Appeals reversed the lower court decision, but issued 8 separate opinions.

Burlington Industries defense
Ellerth is most referenced for its two-part affirmative defense for supervisor sexual harassment. In the case, a supervisor is defined by the ability to take a Tangible Employment Action. A Tangible Employment Action makes the company vicariously liable because the agency relationship was used to take the action. In alleged sex discrimination cases without a Tangible Employment Action, employers may prove that: 

 the employer exercised reasonable care to prevent and correct promptly any sexually harassing behavior, and that 
 the employee unreasonably failed to take advantage of any preventative or corrective opportunities provided by the employer or to avoid harm otherwise. 

Generally, having an effective sexual harassment policy that is used and works is sufficient to satisfy the first prong. Further cases (see EEOC v. Racine) examine whether an employee's failure to take advantage of the policy was unreasonable, but Ellerth holds that when the policy requires reporting to a harasser, it is not unreasonable to fail to do so. (Ellerth would have been required to report to her harasser.)

Judgment
In a 7–2 decision, the Supreme Court ruled in her favor. Justice Anthony Kennedy said that Congress had left it to the courts to determine the controlling principles. This majority ruling was summarized as follows:

Under Title VII, an employee who refuses the unwelcome and threatening sexual advances  of a supervisor, yet suffers no adverse, tangible job consequences, may recover against the employer without showing the employer is negligent or otherwise at fault for the supervisor's actions, but the employer may interpose an affirmative defense.

Justice Kennedy wrote the majority opinion, joined by Chief Justice Rehnquist, Justice Stevens, Justice O'Connor, Justice Souter, and Justice Breyer. Justice Ginsburg wrote a concurring opinion. 

Justice Thomas wrote a dissenting opinion, joined by Justice Scalia.

Notes

References
 Cullen-DuPont, Kathryn. Encyclopedia of Women's History in America (Infobase Publishing, 2009) pp 38-39

External links
 

United States Supreme Court cases
United States Supreme Court cases of the Rehnquist Court
United States labor case law
1998 in United States case law
Sexual harassment in the United States
Sexism
Harassment case law
Ethically disputed working conditions
United States gender discrimination case law